Zgornja Dobrava is a settlement in the Municipality of Radovljica in the Upper Carniola region of Slovenia.

Name
Zgornja Dobrava was attested in written sources as Oberhard in 1351 and Hard in 1368. The name Zgornja Dobrava literally means 'upper Dobrava' and reflects its elevation contrast with neighboring Srednja Dobrava (literally, 'middle Dobrava', about  lower) and Spodnja Dobrava (literally, 'lower Dobrava', about  lower). The place name Dobrava is relatively frequent in Slovenia. It is derived from the Slovene common noun dobrava 'gently rolling partially wooded land' (and archaically 'woods, grove'). The name therefore refers to the local geography.

References

External links

Zgornja Dobrava at Geopedia

Populated places in the Municipality of Radovljica